Religion in Georgia may refer to:

 Religion in Georgia (country)
 Religion in Georgia (U.S. state)